Lincoln Correctional Facility was a United States minimum-security men's prison located at 31–33 West 110th Street in Manhattan, New York, facing the north side of Central Park. It was used primarily as a work-release center for drug offenders; however, around 5% of the roughly 275 inmates it housed were white collar criminals, sometimes for work release.

History 
Before opening as a prison in 1976, the building was used as a branch of the Young Women's Hebrew Association (YWHA) and for housing recently immigrated Jewish women in need of assistance, beginning in 1914. In 1942 it was sold to the U.S. Army and briefly used as a rest-and-relaxation center for local soldiers during World War II, after which it was occupied by the experimental New Lincoln School, and the Northside Center for Child Development, which conducted research in psychology.

It was announced by Governor Andrew Cuomo on May 17, 2019, that the facility would close on September 1st as part of the 2020 State Budget that was approved on April 1. When it closed, there was speculation that it would be sold and turned into condos, affordable housing, or a women's jail, although its status is unknown as of 2022.

References 

Jewish-American history
Prisons in New York (state)
Prisons in New York City
1976 establishments in New York City